North west Wales experienced a slate boom in the first half of the nineteenth century. Three sites stood out as experiencing the most explosive growth: Dinorwic near Llanberis, Penrhyn near Bethesda and Blaenau Ffestiniog.

This article describes the complex evolution of railway passenger services in Blaenau Ffestiniog

Context
The Dinorwic and Penrhyn quarries dealt with the problem of getting their products to market by building their own railways to take slates to ports: the Padarn Railway and the Penrhyn Railway respectively. The LNWR built branches seeking to tap the output, but the quarry owners maintained a tight hold, lest they become beholden to others.

The position at Blaenau Ffestiniog was different in three respects:
 Penrhyn and Dinorwic were monopolies, but there were several competing quarries at Blaenau
 Dinorwic and Penrhyn quarries had short easy routes to ports and national transport, but Blaenau did not
 unlike the Padarn and Penrhyn railways, the Ffestiniog Railway was independent of the quarry companies.

In Blaenau, therefore,

rival railways were encouraged by quarry owners seeking to pay lower charges and receive better service, whereas the Dinorwic and Penrhyn companies actively sought to exclude rival railways
people considering opening rival lines to Blaenau saw the prospect of profit, despite the formidable obstacles of distance and terrain

In addition, neither Llanberis nor Bethesda experienced the explosive population growth witnessed in Blaenau, leading railway promoters to believe a significant potential passenger market existed beyond workmen's trains.

This must all be seen in the context of a boom industry, where heady hopes affected normally sober minds.

Five and a half railways
In all, five separate railway companies built lines to tap Blaenau's seemingly limitless potential:

 The Ffestiniog Railway
 The Festiniog and Blaenau Railway
 The Bala and Festiniog Railway, which was a GWR proxy
 The London and North Western Railway
 British Railways and the revived Ffestiniog Railway latterly rebuilt old and forged new lines in Blaenau's rebirth.
In addition
 The Merionethshire Railway received Royal Assent but was never built; its purpose was to frighten the Ffestiniog Railway.

Passenger stations
All five railway companies built stations in the town, all within an 800-metre radius, most within a 400-metre radius.

 The narrow gauge Ffestiniog Railway (FR) built five stations:
its first terminus  (1865–1870)
the second terminus  (1866–1931)
an interchange with the LNWR,  (also known as ) (1881–1939)
an interchange with the GWR, latterly named  (1883–1939), and
the current interchange with the Conwy Valley Line,  (1982-still open)
The narrow gauge Festiniog and Blaenau Railway (F&BR) built two stations:
its first terminus  (1868 – April 1883), and
its second, temporary terminus  (April–September 1883)
 The standard gauge London and North Western Railway (LNWR) built two stations:
its temporary terminus  (1879–1881)
, an interchange with the FR's  from 1881 to 1939, remaining as a stand-alone station until 1982
 The standard gauge Great Western Railway (GWR) built one station, through its proxy the Bala and Festiniog Railway
an interchange with the FR, latterly named  (1883–1960)
The standard gauge British Railways (BR) built one station:
the current interchange with the FR, named  (1982-still open)

Whether this counts as eight, nine, ten or eleven stations depends on how the interchanges are counted.

Stations' names
Apart from purely informal names, such as "Top Station" and "Bottom Station" used by residents of Creswell, Derbyshire to distinguish their two stations, the stations in Blaenau are especially confusing because of railway practice, anglicising, different sources, the passage of time and names elsewhere.

It was common practice throughout pre-nationalisation Britain for rival railway companies to give their stations the bare name of the town they served, for example two rival companies each had a station in Cleator Moor named "Cleator Moor", two in Bolsover were named "Bolsover" and so on. In Blaenau the FR and the F&BR both called their stations "Duffws", the stations were near each other, but wholly separate. Duffws looks Welsh, but isn't. The GWR and LNWR both named their stations "Blaenau Festiniog" even though they were 400 yards apart and unconnected.

This introduces the second source of complication, "Festiniog" is an anglicised spelling of the Welsh "Ffestiniog", both were used at different periods.

Different authoritative sources sometimes gave stations different names, for example, the station nameboards at the FR's interchange station with the LNWR proclaimed it to be "Blaenau Festiniog Junction", but their timetable and Bradshaw referred to it as "Blaenau Festiniog (L&NW)", meaning "station for the LNWR line". Locals called it "Stesion Fain" (Narrow station).

The fourth cause of complexity is the passage of time, the two Victorian standard gauge stations were officially "Blaenau Festiniog" until 1951 when their names were both separated and corrected, so the ex-GWR station changed from "Blaenau Festiniog" to "Blaenau Ffestiniog Central" and the ex-LNWR station changed from "Blaenau Festiniog" to "Blaenau Ffestiniog North", though that did not appear on its corporate-issue nameboards, which read "Blaenau Ffestiniog Station", a rare if not unique use of "Station" on a station nameboard.

Finally, although the two Duffwses are unique to Blaenau, the station name "Dinas" is not unique, there is a  station near Caernarfon on the FR's sister Welsh Highland Railway, there are also other places beginning "Dinas...", such as Dinas Mawddwy. To add spice to the mix, the F&BR's Duffws station was sometimes called "Dinas" in F&BR literature.

Timeline

The route diagram to the right of this text portrays the evolution of Blaenau's passenger stations. Each new section starts with the opening or closure of a station. The names used in each section seek to use the clearest description or name at the time, but link to the unique names used in Wikipedia.

Sections 11 to 14 show how the FR and standard gauge swapped sides at the start of Blaenau's railway revival.

In the text below spellings are as used at the time.

01: Blaenau Ffestiniog's first passenger station was opened in 1865 by the Festiniog Railway (FR). They named it "Dinas" which derives from mediaeval Welsh meaning "citadel" in English, not the modern Welsh "Dinas" meaning "city".

02: In 1866 the FR opened a town centre station which they named "Duffws". The name looks Welsh, but isn't, it is seemingly related to nearby quarries containing the name "Diffwys" (meaning 'steep slope or mountainside') sometimes written as "Diphwys". From 1866 to 1870 passenger trains from Portmadoc alternated between their two stations. The company referred the line to Dinas as the "Main Line" and the line to Duffws as "The Branch".

03: The narrow gauge Festiniog and Blaenau Railway (F&BR) opened Blaenau's next station, which they also named "Duffws". It was a couple of hundred yards from the FR's Duffws station, on the opposite side of Church Street. It was the northern terminus of their 3½ mile line from Llan Ffestiniog. The F&BR was a completely separate company from the FR. There were now two companies operating in Blaenau – the FR and the F&BR.

04: Blaenau's first station closure occurred in 1870 when the FR closed Dinas to passengers, services being concentrated on Duffws (FR).

05: The LNWR arrived from the north in 1879, having drilled through two miles of solid rock to create Ffestiniog Tunnel. They built a temporary station at the tunnel's southern mouth. Sources differ on what it was called, with "Blaenau Festiniog" being the likeliest. This station was the furthest of all from the town centre. There were now three companies operating in Blaenau – FR, F&BR and LNWR.

06: Two stations opened and one closed on 1 April 1881. The LNWR closed its temporary Pantyrafon terminus by the tunnel mouth and opened its permanent station nearer the town centre, which it called "Blaenau Festiniog". It would go on to be renamed twice ("Blaenau Ffestiniog North" from 1951 and plain "Blaenau Ffestiniog" from 1968) and be described in timetables successively as Blaenau Festiniog (L&NW), Blaenau Festiniog (LMS), Blaenau Festiniog, Blaenau Ffestiniog North and finally Blaenau Ffestiniog.

The new station was built next to North Western Road, on the other side of which ran the FR, who opened a station which doubled as an interchange. The FR's station carried the nameboard "Blaenau Festiniog Junction", but this did not appear on FR literature, and sources rarely mention it. Locally the station was widely referred to as "Stesion Fain" (meaning Narrow station in English.)

07: In 1882 the Great Western Railway's (GWR) proxy, the Bala and Festiniog Railway, started to rebuild the F&BR to standard gauge. All measures were taken to enable F&BR traffic to continue during this process, including laying a third rail. By the Spring of 1883 the need to demolish  to make way for its standard gauge replacement became imperative, so a temporary station was opened at Glynllifon Street, a short distance from the end of the line, enabling Duffws (F&BR) to be closed and demolished.

There were now four companies operating in Blaenau – FR, F&BR, LNWR and GWR.

08: On 10 September 1883 the Bala and Festiniog Railway (i.e. The conversion of the F&BR tracks from narrow to standard gauge meant that no physical junction would ever be possible. The new station was called plain "Blaenau Festiniog", exactly the same as the LNWR station a quarter of a mile away. Sixty eight years later the new GWR/FR station would go on to be renamed , by which name it is recorded on Wikipedia.

Narrow gauge F&BR services and  station were closed three days before the new station opened. There were now three companies operating in Blaenau – FR, LNWR and GWR. It would remain this way until 1923 when the LNWR became part of the London, Midland and Scottish Railway (LMSR), but that did not bring any changes to the stations or lines.

09: The Festiniog Railway's fortunes were closely allied to the slate trade, which, with a few brief respites, were in decline from the 1870s. Duffws (FR) closed to passengers for two years in the early 1920s then closed for good in 1931, though the last train called at the end of the 1930 Summer season. FR passenger services were cut back the couple of hundred yards to terminate at the GWR/FR interchange station, known on Wikipedia by its later name .

10: The Festiniog Railway struggled through the 1930s, especially when the Welsh Highland Railway lifebelt which it grabbed turned out to be made of lead. At the outbreak of the Second World War it ceased all passenger operations, never to resume until the preservation era. The railway closed completely in 1946, though the track through the middle of Blaenau continued to be used by the quarries, using their own staff and locomotives, until the early 1960s. The 1939 closure meant that the railway's two surviving stations in the town –  and their side of the GWR/FR station were closed, leaving just the two standard gauge companies, the LMSR and GWR providing passenger services.

In 1948 Britain's railways were nationalised, the ex-LNWR station became part of the London Midland Region of British Railways and the GWR station became part of BR's Western Region. In 1951 these stations were renamed  and  respectively. From 1948 BR was the only railway company in town.

11: Blaenau's railways hit rock bottom in 1960 when  closed. Double-figure daily usage figures and rising costs made their own case, but the decision to dam Afon Tryweryn and flood the line west of Bala sealed the station's fate.

Blaenau Ffestiniog now had just one company – British Railways – operating just one station – .

12: Blaenau's railways were thrown a lifeline by the creation of Trawsfynydd nuclear power station which needed rail access to handle nuclear fuel. With the Bala line closed the only way to provide this was from the north via Blaenau.

This cut across the FR passenger route, though it left the FR freight route to  intact, but it petered out in 1962 anyway. The layout of the wholly new, quarter-mile cross-Blaenau line allowed room for the FR to get back to town in due course.

This had no immediate effect on passenger provision, but it secured the Conwy Valley Line and the route through Blaenau. Above all, it bought time.

It hosted occasional enthusiasts' specials and in 1989–90 a regular Summer Sundays sightseeing service.

13: With the preservation era FR demonstrably a serious, professional railway with decent financial prospects for the town and area, agreement was reached over where it should go when it got "Back to Blaenau". The objective was for the Conwy Valley Line and the FR to open an interchange station inheriting the virtues and avoiding the vices of previous versions. The one-time Stesion Fain/LNWR site was considered, but the one-time F&BR, later  site was chosen as the best. This involved slewing the standard gauge line to the north side of the cross-Blaenau route to allow the FR to re-enter on the south side, thereby swapping traditional sides at the historic Blaenau Ffestiniog Central site.

On 21 March 1982 British Railways closed the sole station in Blaenau and opened its part of the new  station a quarter of a mile away on the ex-F&BR/ex-GWR site in the middle of town. They did so in the knowledge that the FR were hard on their heels striving to open their part of the new station.

14: The FR fulfilled its part of the bargain on 25 May 1982 when it opened its part of the  interchange.

15: The nuclear power station having closed and all fissile material having been removed, the branch south of  became redundant and closed. It has been protected, if not actively mothballed. Hopes have been expressed that an industrial use such as more nuclear activity at Trawsfynydd will once again secure the branch.

References

Sources

Further material

External links

Railway stations in Wales